

East table

West table

Qualifications for the Yugoslav Inter-Republic League

External links
Football Association of Slovenia 

Slovenian Republic Football League seasons
Yugo
3
Football
Football